Back in the Seventies (Spanish:Allá en el setenta y tantos) is a 1945 Argentine historical drama film directed by Francisco Múgica and starring Silvana Roth, Carlos Cores and Felisa Mary. Roth plays Cecilia Ramos, a fictionalized version of Élida Paso (1867-1893) an Argentine pharmacist who became the first woman from South America to graduate from a university.

The film's sets were designed by Mario Vanarelli.

Cast
Silvana Roth as Cecilia Ramos
Carlos Cores
María Armand
Alberto Bello
Carlos Bellucci
Olimpio Bobbio
Dario Garzay
Gloria Grey
José María Gutiérrez
Virginia Luque
Domingo Mania
Federico Mansilla
Felisa Mary
Mario Medrano
Gonzalo Palomero
Matilde Rivera
Jorge Villoldo

External links

1945 films
1940s historical drama films
Argentine historical drama films
Argentine biographical films
Films directed by Francisco Múgica
Films set in Argentina
Films set in the 1870s
Films scored by Julián Bautista
Films with screenplays by Tulio Demicheli
Argentine black-and-white films
1945 drama films
1940s Argentine films